The S5 service of the S-Bahn Rhein-Main system bearing the KBS (German scheduled railway route) number 645.5

Routes

Homburg Railway 

The Homburg Railway connects Frankfurt Central Station with Friedrichsdorf, via Bad Homburg. It was opened on 10 September 1860 and electrified on 26 September 1970. S-Bahn services commenced on the line on 25 September 1977.

City tunnel 

The city tunnel is an underground, pure S-Bahn route used by almost all services (except for the S7 service which terminates at the central station). In a short section between Mühlberg and Offenbach-Kaiserlei the South Main railway is used.

History 

The S5 was one of the first six services of the Rhine-Main S-Bahn system. In a prior test operation it ran between Friedrichsdorf and Frankfurt Central Station. The service was then called R5 where the letter "R" stands for regional. After the opening of the Frankfurt Citytunnel the service was renamed to S5 and extended to the new Hauptwache underground station. Further extensions of the tunnel followed in 1983 (Konstablerwache) and 1990 (Ostendstraße and Lokalbahnhof) so that the Südbahnhof (South station) became the service's eastern terminal.

Operation 
 Friedrichsdorf – Frankfurt Süd
 Bad Homburg – Frankfurt Süd

External links 

 traffiQ Frankfurt – S5 timetable

Rhine-Main S-Bahn